Tagiades insularis is a butterfly in the family Hesperiidae. It is found on Madagascar and the Comoro Islands. The habitat consists of forests, forest margins and anthropogenic environments.

Subspecies
Tagiades insularis insularis (Madagascar)
Tagiades insularis grandis Evans, 1937 (Comoro Islands: Grand Comore, Moheli and Anjouan)
Tagiades insularis mayotta Evans, 1937 (Comoro Islands: Mayotte)

References

Butterflies described in 1876
Tagiades
Butterflies of Africa
Taxa named by Paul Mabille